Hellinsia chuncheonensis is a moth of the family Pterophoridae. It is known from Korea.

The wingspan is 15–16 mm.

Etymology
The specific name refers to the type locality, Chuncheon, of the holotype.

References

chuncheonensis
Moths of Asia
Insects of Korea
Moths described in 2009